Lode Runner is a video game developed by Presage and published by Natsume for the PlayStation in 1998. It is a compilation game combining ports of Lode Runner: The Legend Returns and the Japan-exclusive Lode Runner Extra.

Reception

The game received mixed reviews. The four reviewers of Electronic Gaming Monthly commented that while it is updated from the original Lode Runner, both the graphics and gameplay are essentially retro. Crispin Boyer and Shawn Smith praised it for staying true to its roots and believed the classic gameplay would appeal to the new generation of gamers, while Kraig Kujawa said that the gameplay did not stand the test of time and Dan Hsu, though he liked both the retention of the original gameplay and the fun two-player mode, said that with flaws such as A.I. glitches and occasionally poor level design, the game is "Solid, but a bit odd." Adam Douglas IGN agreed that the upgrade over the original Lode Runner was extremely modest, but the gameplay holds up well, especially the level creation mode. He concluded that "So this is what it comes down to: do you love Lode Runner? If so, you're going to want to pick this game up, as it's just what you remember. However, if you don't give a crap about retro-gaming and could care less [sic] about this game, don't bother." Next Generation said that the original Lode Runner "is a classic game and deserves to be seen and enjoyed. But if you've already played it countless times before, this re-release won't give you anything new. If you haven't, though, this action-puzzler is well worth a look." GamePro gave it a brief but laudatory review, calling it "a compelling and challenging puzzle game." The review praised the level creation mode, sharp graphics, ambient music, and controller interface.

References

External links
 

1998 video games
Multiplayer and single-player video games
Natsume (company) games
Platform games
PlayStation (console) games
PlayStation (console)-only games
Presage Software games
Video game compilations